Mikael Dolsten (born c. 1958) is a Swedish-American physician scientist, and the President  of research & development-Medical  (chief scientific officer) of the American Pharmaceutical company  Pfizer.

Early life
He was born Mikael Dohlsten. He is Jewish. 

Dolsten  attended Kattegattskolan in Halmstad, Sweden (Kattegattgymnasiet), a gymnasium secondary school in Halmstad, graduating in 1975. He grew up in Halmstad Municipality in the south-west of Sweden.

He studied medicine from January 1979 to 1985 at Lund University in Sweden and obtained a PhD in cancer immunology 1988 at Lund University. Dolsten was appointed associate professor 1990 and adjunct professor in immunology 1996. He was selected as top candidate for a professorship at Uppsala in immunology 1997. Dolsten  has published some 150 original articles and reviews in scientific journals on the topic of immunology, oncology,  cell biology, drug discovery and authored several patents. He pursued scientific studies in immunology and virology 1981 at the Weizman Institute of Science in Rehovot Israel.

Career
Lund University:

Dolsten served at Lund University
as associate and adjunct professor from 1989 to 2000. 
Co-led a research group in immunology and oncology and supervised a number of PhD students at Lund University.  Worked as a physician intern/resident  at several departments at the Lund University Hospital during 1985–1988.

Pharmacia
Dolsten worked from 1988 to 1997 for the Swedish company Pharmacia in Lund. The last few years in this period  he served as head of research for the Lund research center working into immune and cancer therapeutics. This company would be bought by Pfizer in 1997.

AstraZeneca
From 1997 to 2003 he worked for the Swedish pharmaceutical company Astra  that became AstraZeneca as head of research & development for the subsidiary Astra Draco and after the Astra-Zeneca merger as head of Cardiovascular/Metabolic & Gastrointestinal research areas in April 1999, at Mölndal. 

Boehringer Ingelheim

Dolsten was appointed December 2003 as worldwide head of research for the German pharmaceutical company Boehringer Ingelheim in 2003 with responsibility for its research activities in Germany, Austria, Italy, Japan and USA and served  in this role until 2008.

Pfizer
He was appointed  President of R&D at the American Pharma Wyeth 2008. Dolsten joined Pfizer in 2009 during the acquisition of Wyeth as Head of 
BioTherapeutics. He became Pfizer's Chief Scientific Officer and President of R&D on 26 May 2010, replacing Martin Mackay, who moved to the UK as head of research for AstraZeneca. In his ongoing more than 10 years of  tenure as Chief Scientific Officer at Pfizer a number of  significant medicines and vaccines  have been approved and  used   in medical practice, including Prevnar 13, Inlyta, Xeljanz, Eliquis, Xalcori, Bosulif, Daurismo, Lorbrena, Besponsa, Ibrance, Trumenba, Xtandi (acquired from Medivation), Vyndaqel, Eucrisa (acquired from Anacor), Braftovi (acquired from  ARRAY),  Bavencio, Inflectra (acquired from  Hospira),  Trazimera, Ruxience, and Zirabev. Dolsten has been part of leading the Pfizer Covid vaccine effort in 2020

On 14 May 2014 he appeared, with two other Pfizer executives, in front of the Science and Technology Select Committee to answer questions. The day before, three Pfizer executives had been interviewed in front of the Business, Innovation and Skills Committee.

Dolsten served as scientific advisor to the Obama administration's task force for improving regulatory and drug development  as well as the VP Biden led Cancer moonshot and the NCI Blue Ribbon Panel. He has been founding co-chair with NIH Director Francis Collins for the public private consortium AMP,  Accelerating Medicine Partnership.

He is on an advisory board of the Pharmaceutical Research and Manufacturers of America, board member of Research America and board member of the public company Karyopharm Therapeutics in Boston.

Dolsten has been elected to the Royal Swedish Academy of Engineering Science.

See also
 Sir Mene Pangalos of AstraZeneca

References

External links
 Pfizer
 Parliament TV May 2014

1950s births
21st-century Swedish physicians
AstraZeneca people
Lund University alumni
People from Halmstad
Pfizer people
Swedish business executives
Living people